Monique Hollick (born 8 December 1989) is an Australian rules footballer who played for the Adelaide Football Club in the AFL Women's competition. She was drafted by Adelaide with their eighteenth selection and 136th overall in the 2016 AFL Women's draft. She made her debut in the thirty-six point win against  at Thebarton Oval in the opening round of the 2017 season. She played the next week before missing the round six match against  at TIO Stadium due to getting married. She did not return for the remainder of the season and consequently missed the premiership, she finished with three matches in her debut season.

References

External links 

1989 births
Living people
Adelaide Football Club (AFLW) players
Australian rules footballers from New South Wales